This is a list of Curaçao national football team games in 2017.

2017 games

1. Match cancelled due to the use of the Ergilio Hato Stadium as a makeshift shelter for victims of Hurricane Irma from the island country of Sint Maarten.

References 

2017
2017 national football team results
2016–17 in Curaçao football
2017–18 in Curaçao football